The 2003 World Table Tennis Championships women's singles was the 47th edition of the women's singles championship.
Wang Nan defeated Zhang Yining in the final by four sets to three, to win a third consecutive title.

Finals

References

External links
 Main draw archived from ITTF.
 Players' matches. ITTF.
 WM 2003 Paris (Frankreich). tt-wiki.info (in German).

-
World